XTRMNTR (pronounced "Exterminator") is the sixth studio album by Scottish rock band Primal Scream. It was first released on 31 January 2000 in the United Kingdom by Creation Records and on 2 May 2000 in the United States by Astralwerks. It peaked at number 3 on the UK Albums Chart. 

In a departure from their earlier, more hedonistic recordings, the band took a more political stance on the album, attacking government, police, and multinational corporations. Its sound is more aggressive and forceful than Primal Scream's previous output, with harsh, electronic sounds reminiscent of industrial music forming the basis for many of its songs. Although Gary Mounfield (aka Mani) joined the band in 1997 and recorded a selection of tracks on their previous album Vanishing Point (1997), it marked the first time he shared songwriting credits with them, as well as his first full album since his time with The Stone Roses. 

Kevin Shields of My Bloody Valentine was seen as a "semi-permanent member" of the band around the release of the album by performing live, helping producing the album and playing on songs. The album also features contributions from The Chemical Brothers and Bernard Sumner of New Order.

The album is notable for being the final full-length release on Creation Records, with the track "Accelerator" later lifted to become the final single released on the label.

Critical reception

At Metacritic, which assigns a weighted average score out of 100 to reviews from mainstream critics, the album received an average score of 90, based on 16 reviews, indicating "universal acclaim".

NME magazine rated XTRMNTR #2 in its "Top 50 Albums of the Year 2000", and later at the NME Carling Awards 2001, it won "Best Album" of the year. Uncut, like NME, named it at #2 on their list of the best albums of 2000.

Over the years, it has gathered more praise, including appearances on lists of the top albums of the 2000s: NME placed it at #3 of their top 50 albums of decade list and Pitchfork placed it at #142 in its Top 200 Albums of the 2000s list. Metacritic placed it at #20 of the 40 best reviewed albums released 2000-9. In 2001, Q magazine named it as one of the "50 Heaviest Albums of All Time". Praising the production, Stylus Magazine included the album on their 2006 list of the "Top Ten Best Sounding Records, 1997–Present", and later ranked the album at number 10 on their "Stylus Decade" list of the "Top 100 Albums of the 2000s".

In October 2011, NME placed "Swastika Eyes" at #45 and "Accelerator" at #114 on its list "150 Best Tracks of the Past 15 Years". In 2014, they ranked "Shoot Speed/Kill Light" at #190 and "Accelerator" at #497 and in their list of the "500 Greatest Songs of All Time".

Referring to the 2013 update, the album ranks at number 160 in NME's The 500 Greatest Albums of All Time.

In 2019, the album was ranked 65th on The Guardians 100 Best Albums of the 21st Century list.

Track listing

Personnel
Credits adapted from liner notes.

Primal Scream
 Bobby Gillespie – vocals, guitar, samples
 Andrew Innes – guitar
 Robert Young – guitar, programming
 Martin Duffy – keyboards, programming
 Gary 'Mani' Mounfield – bass
 Darrin Mooney – drums
 Jim Hunt – saxophone
 Duncan Mackay – trumpet

Additional musicians
 Marco Nelson
 Kevin Shields
 Bernard Sumner
 Phil Mossman
 Darren Morris
 Zac Danziger
 Brendan Lynch
 Greg Knowles
 Gay-Yee Westerhoff
 Keith Tenniswood

Production
 Primal Scream – production (1, 2, 3), recording
 Brendan Lynch – production (1, 2, 3, 11), co-production (1, 3), recording (2, 3, 11)
 Kevin Shields – production (11), mixing (2, 9)
 Adrian Maxwell Sherwood – recording (6, 7)
 Jagz Kooner – production (4), mixing (4), programming (7)
 David Holmes – production (6, 7), co-production (6)
 Hugo Nicolson – production (8), co-production (8), mixing (8)
 The Chemical Brothers – production (10), mixing (10)
 Tim Holmes – production (11)
 Dan the Automator – production (5), mixing (5)
 Andy Wilkinson – engineering (2, 9)
 Jon Weiner – engineering (6)
 Alan Branch – recording (6, 7)

Charts

Certifications

References

External links
 

2000 albums
Primal Scream albums
Creation Records albums
Industrial rock albums
Albums produced by Dan the Automator
Albums produced by Kevin Shields